The Renfrewshire derby is a football derby in Scotland, contested between the senior clubs Greenock Morton and St Mirren.

Since the sides first met in 1882, the fixture has grown in significance over the years, due in part to the demise of other Renfrewshire football clubs, and is one of the most hotly contested derbies in Scotland today. Although both sides have regularly competed at the same level of Scottish football, recent years have seen St Mirren competing in the Scottish Premiership, with Morton competing in the lower leagues. However, the annual Renfrewshire Cup, a regional cup competition turned pre-season friendly, generally ensures that there is at least one Renfrewshire Derby a year.

In the 2014–15 season, St Mirren were relegated from the SPFL Premiership, and Morton were promoted from Scottish League One, meaning that the two sides met in league action for the first time in 15 years. As of 6 August 2016, it was confirmed that Morton have gone 6238 days without a competitive win against St Mirren. In November 2016 Morton recorded a 3–1 victory over St Mirren, their first in the league in 17 years.

The rivalry sees a large amount of animosity between the two sets of fans.

History

Head-to-head

As of: 11 November 2020

Recent meetings
After St Mirren were relegated from the Premiership at the end of 2014–15 and Morton were promoted from League One, the sides met for the first time in the league for 15 years. The meetings in the Championship since are detailed below.

Early History (1874–1901)
Two of the oldest professional football clubs in Scotland, Morton were formed 1874 in Greenock, while the St Mirren cricket club was founded a year later. Its members branched off into rugby and then football in 1877. Despite their proximity to each other they wouldn't meet for another five years. After St Mirren defeated Yoker 8–0 and Morton overcame Johnstown Rovers 2–1 in the first round of the 1882–83 Scottish Cup they were drawn to face each other in the second round. The match was played at Cappielow on 30 September 1882 and the home side ran out comfortable victors, winning 5–1.

St Mirren were founder members of the Scottish Football League in 1890 but, as Morton didn't join the league until 1893 with the formation of the old Second Division, the first league meeting wasn't until 1900. Played at Cappielow on 1 September 1900, there was similar result as Morton overcame their rivals 1–0.

In the intervening years, the sides met eight times in the Renfrewshire Cup. The first of these came in 1884, two years after Morton's 5–1 Scottish Cup win. On 20 December 1884, a crowd of 4,500 people watched an entertaining third round match end 3–4 at Westmarch in Paisley. St Mirren would not get their first victory against their rivals until their next meeting on 10 December 1887. A crowd of 4,000 people witnessed St Mirren's 2–0 victory in the third round match at Westmarch. As the century drew to a close, the teams met for the first time in a Renfrewshire Cup Final. St Mirren were looking to win their third Renfrewshire Cup in-a-row and seventh overall, while Morton were aiming for a second title when the original match on 29 April 1899 was played at the neutral Underwood Park in Paisley. A 1–1 draw meant the need for a replay a week later at the same venue which Morton won 2–0.

Results

Source: Scottish Football Historical Archive

21st Century
St Mirren started the new millennium in the perfect fashion by sealing promotion back to the top flight of Scottish football for the first time in almost a decade. This meant that four annual meetings between the sides that fans had grown used to came to an end; the sides wouldn't meet again until a League Cup match in 2002 after both sides suffered relegation in the 2000–01 season. This favoured the Paisley side as St Mirren remained in a higher league than Morton until both sides found their way into the Championship for season 2015–16. This led to a period of St Mirren dominance, with Morton's last competitive win coming on 10 April 1999. The 17-year sequence finally ended on 1 November 2016 with a 3-1 Morton victory at Cappielow.

Results
From season 1999–2000 to 2011.

Source:Statto.com

Notes

References

External links
 saintmirren.net
 gmfc.net

Football in Renfrewshire
Football in Inverclyde
Greenock Morton F.C.
St Mirren F.C.
Scotland football derbies
Recurring sporting events established in 1882